Na Ji is an American biophysicist and the Luis Alvarez Memorial Chair in Experimental Physics at UC Berkeley, where her work focuses on optical microscopy techniques for in vivo imaging and biophotonics. She has a joint appointment as faculty scientist at Lawrence Berkeley National Laboratory.

Early life and education  
Na Ji earned her Bachelor of Science in Chemical Physics at the University of Science & Technology of China in Hefei, China in 2000 before pursuing a Ph.D. in Chemistry at the  University of California, Berkeley in 2005. She then joined the Janelia Research Campus of Howard Hughes Medical Institute as a postdoctoral fellow, before starting her own group there in 2011, focused developing new optical microscopy techniques for brain research.

Research and career 
Her research at Janelia Research Campus was dedicated to understanding the input-output relationships in neural circuits, using novel microscopy techniques mixing structured light and adaptive optics. 
In 2017 she joined UC Berkeley as an associate professor in the department of Physics and Molecular and Cellular Biology. She is married to Nobel prize laureate Eric Betzig.

References

External links

Women physicists
Living people
University of California, Berkeley faculty
Biophysicists
Women in optics
Year of birth missing (living people)